The Federal Communications Agency (abbreviated Rossvyaz) is a federal agency controlled by the Ministry of Digital Development, Communications and Mass Media. It is responsible for providing public services, the management of state property and law enforcement functions in the field of communication and information.

Functions and role
The main activities of the Agency are:
Ensuring the implementation of inter-state and federal programs in the field of communication and information;
Provision of public importance of services in the field of communication and information to the public on the conditions set by federal law, including: providing in the prescribed manner of distribution and proper use of radio frequency (RF channels) and civil and numbering resources;
Conformity assessment in the field of communication and information;
Organization in the prescribed manner of functioning, development and modernization of federal communications and national information and telecommunications infrastructure;
Organization of a network of certification centers digital signature;
Publication of individual legal acts in the field of communication and information on the basis and in pursuance of the Constitution of Russia, federal constitutional laws, federal laws, regulations and orders of the President of Russia, and orders of the Government of Russia and the Ministry of Communications and Mass Media;
Maintenance of registers, registers and inventories.
 
Is the only body in the country issuing stamps and other government postage stamps (GZPO), which are designed and printed in the Mark Publishing and Trading Centre.

Heads of the agency
Agency leadership position held by the following:
 Dmitry Milovantsev (March 18, 2004 - July 9, 2004)
 Andrey Beskorovainy (July 2004/10 June 2005 - 20 June 2007)
 Valeriy Bugaenko (June 20, 2007 - June 28, 2011 [3])
 Oleg G. Dukhovnitsky (April 23, 2012 - November 20, 2020)

See also
 Russian Post

References

Government of Russia